Aksigorta is an insurance company in Turkey, belonging to Sabancı Holding in partnership with Belgian insurer Ageas, an international insurance company with more than 180 years experience in the sector. Ageas has acquired a 31% stake in Aksigorta, paying USD 220 million for shares previously owned by Sabancı Holding. As a result of this acquisition, Ageas and Sabancı Holding now have equal control of the company.

Area of activity 
Founded in 1960 in the cities of Adana and Istanbul to serve companies within the Sabancı Group, Aksigorta is today one of Turkey's leading insurance companies.

Aksigorta operates throughout Turkey with 578 employees, 1,500 independent agencies, 30 brokerage houses, the 900 branches of sister company Akbank, and a network of nearly 4,500 contracted institutions.

Board of directors

Social responsibility

The “Risk And Safety” art project
Aksigorta's second biggest social responsibility project Works based on the ‘Risk and Safety’ theme were exhibited at the Kanyon Shopping Mall, Sabancı Center and the Aksigorta Buildings in Beyoğlu and Fındıklı, followed by a tour of various universities in Anatolia.

“Keep Living, Turkey” 
More than 1 million people were educated on protecting against natural disasters through a variety of seminars and training sessions.

Aksigorta Fire and Earthquake Simulation Center 
Established in 1996 in Istanbul to provide children with training to protect themselves from catastrophes like fire and earthquakes, and to raise their awareness of insurance.

References 

Companies of Turkey